Mika Rissanen (born 1978) is a Finnish history researcher and author of non-fiction and young adult literature.

In 2005, Rissanen's book Antiikin Urheilu (Sports in Antiquity, co-written with Sami Koski and Juha Tahvanainen) won Tieto-Finlandia award for the best non-fiction book in Finland. In 2016 his non-fiction book Down Beer Street: History in a Pint Glass (co-written with Juha Tahvanainen) was published in English, in German and in Italian.

Rissanen has written his young adult thrillers, Arkeomysteeri series (Archeomystery) in co-operation with Juha Tahvanainen using the pseudonym Nemo Rossi.

Academic researches of Rissanen are focused in ancient history and European cultural history.

Bibliography

Non-fiction books

 Antiikin Urheilu ("Sports in Antiquity") (2004)
 Hävityksen historiaa: Eurooppalaisen vandalismin vuosisadat ("A History of Destruction: European Vandalism through the Ages") (2007)
 Kuohuvaa historiaa: tarinoita tuopin takaa ("History of Europe in 24 Pints") (2014)
 Rooma, suden kaupunki ("Rome, a City of the Wolf") (2018)

Young adult literature
 Rooman sudet ("The Wolves of Rome") (2012)
 Mafian linnut ("The Mafia Birds") (2014)
 Jumalista seuraava ("Next to the Gods") (2014)
 Viimeinen etruski ("The Last Etruscan") (2016)
 Salainen veljeskunta ("The Secret Brotherhood") (2018)

References

Tieto-Finlandia Award winners
Finnish crime writers
Finnish male novelists
21st-century Finnish historians
1978 births
Living people
21st-century Finnish novelists
21st-century male writers
21st-century pseudonymous writers